Parson Jonathan Fisher (1768–1847) was the first Congregational minister from 1794 to 1837 in the small village of Blue Hill, Maine in the United States. Although his primary duties as a country parson engaged much of his time, Fisher was also a farmer, scientist, mathematician, surveyor, and writer of prose and poetry. He bound his own books, made buttons and hats, designed and built furniture, painted sleighs, was a reporter for the local newspaper, helped found Bangor Theological Seminary, dug wells, built his own home and raised a large family.

Truly a renaissance man in the breadth of his accomplishments Fisher invites comparison with a Franklin or Jefferson. In his manners, morals and writings Fisher represents the best of the vigorous New England churchmen who shaped the standards of their congregations during America's formative years.

Biography 
Jonathan Fisher was born in New Braintree, Massachusetts in 1768 and reared in the home of his uncle a minister, because his father, a Revolutionary War soldier had died. As a young man he considered becoming a blacksmith, cabinet maker or clockmaker, but his intellectual gifts were evident and his family was able to send him to Harvard in 1788. He studied liberal arts and divinity, supporting himself by waiting on other students in the dining hall. During this time he developed a curious shorthand or code in which his notes were kept.

He came to Blue Hill Maine in 1796 as the first settled pastor of the Congregational Church. By November 2, 1797, his original house was completed by the work of his own hands, aided by those of his parishioners. The first house, which was in use for 100 years, was torn down by a Fisher descendant in 1896. It formed the shell of the present house which was begun in 1814, again largely by the parson himself. His skill and taste as a builder and designer are evident in its rooms.

The Reverend Jonathan Fisher, Master of Arts, a degree and title in which he took much pride, was a most unusual and remarkably gifted man. When at the close of the 18th century he came to Blue Hill, then a frontier village "in a wilderness", he was seemingly leaving behind him all those intellectual and artistic pursuits and resources in which he delighted. Yet, instead of leaving these in the "Seat of the Muses", which was his name for Harvard College and Cambridge, he transported them to his lonely, far-flung parish, and with no little success, grafted many of them upon the people, and upon the pioneer institutions of his new charge.

A student of languages all his life, he did not neglect his Hebrew, his Latin, or his Greek. In his study on the right entrance to his house, he read his Hebrew Bible at five o'clock each morning, in winter by the light of his "blazing logs"; his Latin and Greek he taught to four or five young men, who usually boarded with him and his own large family. Devoted to drawing and painting, he somehow managed to pursue these arts even in Blue Hill.

Industrious almost beyond belief, and possessed of an unflagging physical vitality, he relieved his omnipresent poverty and increased the few hundred dollars of his meager salary by farming his own acres, concocting medical remedies, braiding numberless straw hats, sawing out buttons from the bones of farm animals, and even of dead household pets, painting names on vessels or painting sleighs (at $2.50) each, making pumps, chairs, chests, hair-combs, tables, bureaus, bedsteads, cradles, even drumsticks for the local militia (at 25 cents a pair), and by repairing much of the shaky furniture in Blue Hill. And, with all these labors, he found time to write many poems, and several books.

Nor were his activities confined to his parish. Although he nurtured its library, was the power behind its Academy, founded in 1803 (in which he encouraged "the fine arts" as well as the study of classics and mathematics), and watched over the minds as well as the souls of its people, he went on long missionary journeys, was an active Trustee of the Bangor Theological Seminary (and an untiring beggar for its needs as well!). He was an ardent speaker and writer in the cause of bettering the lot of the Negroes and sponsored from its beginning the American Society for the Colonization of Liberia.

Through these and other labors both in his church and at home he added immeasurably to the cultural dignity of his village for more than half a century. Blue Hill still respects and honors him.

Mary Ellen Chase, JONATHAN FISHER: MAINE PARSON 1768 - 1847

Blue Hill Congregational Church 

No one can hope to understand Jonathan Fisher unless they realize that first and foremost he was a Congregationalist minister. He lived his life in obedience to the precepts of his religion and did his utmost to defend the faith as he understood it. In his writings, his artwork, but perhaps most of all in the example of his life he strove to center his attention on his religious duties.

New England Congregationalism has its roots in Puritanism and by extension Calvinism. Fisher constantly chided himself for his pleasure in "temporal" matters such as painting, mathematics, etc. which he believed took away from his primary religious responsibilities both to himself and his congregation.

In Jonathan Fisher's time Congregationalism dominant throughout New England. It could be stern religion, even by the standards of the day. Calvinists believed that God is infinite and transcendent. To know the will of God is man's supreme end. This will is known to man through the scriptures, whose writers were "sure and authentic amanuenses of the Holy Spirit". While God is the source of all good, man is guilty and corrupt from birth. To redeem man, the Son of God became incarnate in the person of Jesus Christ.

When man is united to Christ, the benefits of salvation are achieved. This union is achieved only through the special operation of the Holy Spirit in the faithful. This assurance which the believer has of salvation rests on the divine choice of the man to salvation; and this falls back on God's eternal sovereign purpose, whereby He has predestined some to eternal life and some to eternal death. The former he calls to salvation, and they are kept by him in progressive faith and holiness.

Congregationalists believed that the Christian Church is universal, with the multitude gathered from diverse nations agreeing on the tenets of one common faith. This universalism may explain why Fisher campaigned so strongly for better treatment for Native Americans. He was also very active in the attempt to eliminate slavery by proposing that slaves be purchased from their owners and sent back to Africa as free men and women.

The pastor played a central role in the Congregationalist Church. He not only administered the sacraments, but also was responsible for maintaining church discipline - admonishing, or even excommunicating those who failed to abide by church doctrine. Over time and as new sects such as the Baptists entered the Blue Hill region, the severity of Calvinist doctrine became less acceptable to the congregation. Fisher, however, never wavered from his sense of duty. "Father" Fisher, as he liked to be called, spent his years supporting and maintaining the faith that he first embraced as a young man.

Notebooks and journals 

Throughout his life, Fisher kept a daily journal, and copies of all his letters, providing an almost unparalleled glimpse into a life in Federal era New England.  His notebooks and sketchbooks record his observations and interests in scientific matters, surveying, engineering, mathematics, geometry, agriculture, and natural history.

A journal digitised by the United States' National Oceanic and Atmospheric Administration describes Fisher's observations of sunspots during 1816-1817.

Writings by Jonathan Fisher 
Scripture Animals, or Natural History of the Living Creatures Named in the Bible Written Especially for Youth Illustrated with Cuts. By Jonathan *Fisher, A.M. Portland, Published by William Hyde, (1834)

Jonathan Fisher bibliography 
Jonathan Fisher, Maine Parson, 1768-1847- Mary Ellen Chase, New York, MacMillan Company (1948)
Index to Mary Ellen Chase Jonathan Fisher, Maine Parson prepared by Rev. Gary Vencill 
A Goodly Heritage - PART II, 'The Puritan Tradition', Chapter I, 'The Early Church in Blue Hill', Chapter II, 'The Correspondence of Reverend Mr. Fisher' - Mary Ellen Chase, New York, Henry Holt and Company, Inc. (1932)
Let Every Hour Be Filled to the Brim, Down East Magazine Article, September, 1995
Historic Maine Parsonage - The Jonathan Fisher House, Blue Hill, Maine - article by Esther E. Wood, Daughters of the American Revolution Magazine, August–September 1961
Jonathan Fisher of Blue Hill Maine - Kevin D. Murphy, University of Massachusetts Press, (2010)
A Lantern in the Wind - The Life of Mary Ellen Chase - Elienne Squire, Fithian Press, Santa Barbara - (1995).
Head of the Bay - Sketches and Pictures of Blue Hill, Maine - Annie L. Clough The Shoreacre Press, (1953)
Maine in the Early Republic: From Revolution to Statehood - Chapter 11, 'Jonathan Fisher and the 'Universe of Being' by Richard Moss.  University Press of New England (1988).
Versatility Yankee Style: the Cultural Diversity of Rev. Jonathan Fisher, John H. Bellamy and the Hardy family (1977)
Versatile Yankee: The Art of Jonathan Fisher, 1768-1847 by Alice Winchester. Princeton, NJ, Pyne Press, 1973
A Wondrous Journey, Jonathan Fisher and the Making of Scripture Animals - Jane Bianco, Rockland, ME, Farnsworth Art Museum (2013)
Biographical Sketch of the Rev. Jonathan Fisher of Blue Hill, Maine by Gaylord Hall (1945)
Memoir of Rev. Jonathan Fisher of Blue Hill, Maine (1889)
"The House the Parson Built" by Abbott Lowell Cummings.  Old Time New England Magazine, Volume: 56 Number: 204, Spring, 1966
Smith, Raoul The Life of Jonathan Fisher (1768-1847) Volume 1 (from his birth through the year 1798), self-published, 2006. 317 pp.
Smith, Raoul The Language of Jonathan Fisher (1768-1847). Publications of the American Dialect Society, No. 72. University of Alabama Press, 1985. 194 pp.
Smith, Raoul "The Speech of Jonathan Fisher (1768-1847) of Blue Hill, Maine," Annual Proceedings of the Dublin Seminar for New England Folklife, ed. by P. Benes, Boston University Press, 1985, pp. 70–76.
Smith, Raoul "An Early American Unpublished Hebrew-English Lexicon," Jewish Language Review, 3(1983):19-28.
Smith, Raoul"A Description of the Penobscot and Passamaquoddy Indians in 1808," Man in the Northeast 14(1978):52-56.
Smith, Raoul "An Early Nineteenth Century Penobscot Wordlist," International Journal of American Linguistics 43(1977):101-4.
Smith, R. and G. Pappin, "The Coded Manuscripts of Jonathan Fisher (1768-1847): Some Techniques in Generating and Editing Parallel Texts, SIGLASH (Special Interest Group on Language Analysis and Studies in the Humanities of the Association of Computing Machinery) Newsletter, 9.4(1976):10-21.
Smith, Raoul "The Philosophical Alphabet of Jonathan Fisher (1768-1847)," American Speech 50(1975):36-49.
Brophy, Alfred L., Property and Progress: Antebellum Landscape Art and Property Law, McGeorge law Review 40 (2009):603-59.

Jonathan Fisher House 

Jonathan Fisher's home in Blue Hill, Maine is open to the public seasonally. It is maintained and operated by The Jonathan Fisher Memorial, Inc., and was listed on the National Register of Historic Places in 1969.

References

External links

 Jonathan Fisher House

1768 births
1847 deaths
Harvard University alumni
American Congregationalists
People from New Braintree, Massachusetts
People from Blue Hill, Maine
Farmers from Maine